Rear Admiral Roy Alexander George Clare,  (born 30 September 1950) is a non-executive Director/Trustee in the 'third sector', including appointments as: inaugural Chair of the Chelmsford Cultural Development Trust; as a member of the Board of Trustees of Good Things Foundation, the UK's leading digital inclusion charity; and The Heritage Alliance, a significant advocacy body for England's heritage.

Formerly a Flag Officer in the Royal Navy, he has more than twenty years' experience as a museum director and in leadership and governance of cultural bodies.

In April 2011 he was appointed director of the Auckland War Memorial Museum in New Zealand, replacing interim director Sir Don McKinnon. His contract was twice extended by the Museum's Trust Board, but he and his wife returned to the UK at the end of 2016 to be nearer family. His successor as Director was David Gaimster.

Early life and naval career
Clare was born in Hammersmith, London, on 30 September 1950. He moved with his family from London to Cape Town, South Africa, where he attended St George's Grammar School.

During his naval career he studied at the Britannia Royal Naval College, Dartmouth (passing out in 1972 as the winner of that year's Queen's Sword of Honour), the Royal Naval Staff College, Greenwich, and the Royal College of Defence Studies (1993). He was Military Assistant to the Minister of State for the Armed Forces (1989–91) and the Assistant Director of Navy Plans (Ships) (1993–96).

He was captain of the Third Destroyer Squadron in 1991–92 and in 1998–99 was commodore of the Britannia Royal Naval College, where he was responsible for preparing new entrant officers for their careers. While Commodore at the college he founded the Britannia Museum, opening the college to public visitors for the first time.

Clare was a trustee of the historic vessel HMS Bronington between 1989 and 1999, after she was decommissioned from the Royal Navy; he was vice-president of the Bronington Trust in 1999 until the Trust ceased to exist in 2002. He edited the book HMS Bronington: A Tribute to One of Britain's Last Wooden Walls And a Celebration of The Ton Class, which was published in 1996.

Museums career
Clare was director of the National Maritime Museum between 2000 and 2007, during which time he oversaw a series of exhibitions, including Elizabeth, Skin Deep and Nelson & Napoleon. He instigated SeaBritain 2005, a partnership with Visit Britain and sixty other organisations to commemorate the bicentenary of Admiral Nelson's victory in the Battle of Trafalgar.

Clare also led a major re-structuring of collections management, including the creation of a comprehensive inventory, improved conservation facilities and a partnership project with Chatham Historic Dockyard to display and store models of ships. He initiated the £16 million Time and Space project to restore buildings at the Royal Observatory, create new galleries and education spaces, build a 120-seat planetarium – the Peter Harrison Planetarium – and generally upgrade the visitor facilities. The refurbished Royal Observatory was opened by Queen Elizabeth II in May 2007.

During this time Clare was also Director of Queens House, the Caird Library and the Royal Observatory, Greenwich. From 2001 to 2007 he was chairman of a leadership working-group established by the National Museum Directors' Council. During that period he was a member of a maritime policy think-tank called the Greenwich Forum. Between 2005 and 2007 he was a member of the board of Creative and Cultural Skills (a Sector Skills Council for museums) and between 2009 and 2011 he was a member of the board of the Qualifications and Curriculum Development Agency.

From 2007 Clare was chief executive of the Museums, Libraries and Archives Council (MLA), of which he had been a board member during the previous year. During his tenure as chief executive the MLA was substantially restructured to improve effectiveness and reduce operating costs. The slimmed-down organisation was subsequently merged within Arts Council England. During that period Clare was also chairman of Living Places, a grouping of UK cultural agencies which aimed to foster the benefits of cultural and sporting opportunities in the community. The five agencies involved in the project were the Arts Council England, the Commission for Architecture and the Built Environment (CABE), English Heritage, the Museums, Libraries and Archives Council and Sport England.

In April 2011 Clare was appointed director of the Auckland War Memorial Museum in New Zealand, replacing interim director Sir Don McKinnon. In this role, he was responsible for leading a fundamental review of the museum's strategic vision, culminating in the publication of 'Future Museum' in 2012.  Since then, guided by the published vision, the museum has invested substantially in its collections, professional capacities and digital resources; detailed plans for further capital investment are being laid. In October 2015 the Trust Board of the museum reported double-digit growth in audiences and high levels of customer satisfaction.

In 2014 Clare was elected to the Board of Museums Aotearoa (the association for New Zealand's museums); he was elected Chair of Museums Aotearoa in May 2015. He stepped down from the Board at the conclusion of a year as chair in May 2016. That month he announced that despite being urged to do so he had chosen not to accept the Trust Board's offer of a further extension to his contract as Director of Auckland War Memorial Museum. He and his wife returned to the UK at the end of December 2016, to rejoin their family who live in England.

During a sabbatical in 2017 Clare progressed a long-postponed maritime research project. He now has roles as a non-executive director/trustee in the 'third sector', social businesses, charities and not-for-profit organisations. He is a regular guest speaker on board ships of the Noble Caledonia cruise line, where his subjects include maritime history, navigational practice, museum life and contemporary leadership.

Recognition
Clare was appointed a Commander of the Order of the British Empire in 2007 "for services to museums", and in the same year he received an honorary doctorate from the University of Greenwich.

In 2018 Clare was appointed a Deputy Lieutenant Deputy Lieutenant of Essex. He was awarded the Queen's Silver Jubilee Medal in 1977 and also the General Service Medal in 1977 and in 1989. He was made a Freeman of the City of London in 2001, of the Worshipful Company of Shipwrights in 2002 and of the Worshipful Company of Clockmakers in 2004. In 2001 he became a Companion of the Chartered Management Institute; and he was a Fellow of the Royal Institute of Navigation between 2005 and 2008.

Personal life
A keen yachtsman, Clare was chief mate of the Royal Navy yacht Adventure in the first Whitbread Round the World Race. He and his wife Sarah (an Anglican Priest) have a son and two daughters and two granddaughters. Their home is in Essex on the Blackwater Estuary where they keep a sailing boat. He is a naval member of the Royal Yacht Squadron.

Notes

References

Living people
Graduates of Britannia Royal Naval College
Commanders of the Order of the British Empire
Deputy Lieutenants of Essex
Directors of the National Maritime Museum
Royal Navy rear admirals
1950 births
Directors of the Auckland War Memorial Museum
Military personnel from London
Graduates of the Royal College of Defence Studies
Graduates of the Royal Naval College, Greenwich